The Serpentine Dam is a rockfill embankment dam with a concrete face and a controlled spillway across the Serpentine River, located in the South West region of Tasmania, Australia.

The impounded reservoir, also formed with the Edgar Dam and the Scotts Peak Dam, is called Lake Pedder which flooded Lake Edgar, a naturally forming fault scarp pond. The dam was constructed in 1971 by the Hydro Electric Corporation (TAS) as part of the Gordon River Power Development Scheme for the purpose of generating hydro-electric power via the conventional Gordon Power Station. Water from Lake Pedder is diverted to Lake Gordon (formed by the Gordon Dam) via the McPartlan Pass Canal.

Location and features
The Serpentine Dam, together with the Edgar Dam and the Scotts Peak Dam, are three major dams that form the headwaters for the Gordon River Power Development Scheme. The dam is located near Lake Pedder's most northwesterly point where the Serpentine River descends from the Frankland Range into what is now known as the Pedder Reach. At the southern end of the Lake Pedder, the Scotts Peak Dam impounds the upper reaches of the Huon River. The Edgar Dam forms a saddle dam at Lake Pedder's most easterly point. The water in Lake Pedder provides around 40% of the water used in the Gordon Power Station. The water flows to Lake Gordon via McPartlan Canal. Water from Lake Gordon then exits through the Gordon Power Station releasing via the tailrace into the Gordon River.

At 100% capacity the dam wall holds back  of water. The dam wall has a controlled spillway capable of discharging .

The construction of the Serpentine Dam resulted in the loss of one of the significant sub-populations of the endangered Centrolepis pedderensis, while the nearby Gordon Dam caused the loss of another. It is now only known to exist in one location on the Frankland Range. One sub-population existed along the Serpentine River and is now inundated as a direct cause of the creation of this dam.

See also

 List of dams in Tasmania

References 

Hydro Tasmania dams
Embankment dams
Dams completed in 1971
Infrastructure in Tasmania
Gordon River power development scheme